Bolshaya Klimovskaya is a rural locality (a village) in Vozhegodskoye Urban settlement, Vozhegodsky District, Vologda Oblast, Russia. The population was 458 as of 2002.

Geography 
Bolshaya Klimovskaya is located 1 km northwest of Vozhega (the district's administrative centre) by road. Vozhega is the nearest rural locality.

References 

Rural localities in Vozhegodsky District